The 2014–15 Basketball League of Serbia season is the 9th season of the Basketball League of Serbia, the highest professional basketball league in Serbia. It is also 71st national championship played by Serbian clubs inclusive of nation's previous incarnations as Yugoslavia and Serbia & Montenegro.

The first half of the season consists of 12 teams and 132-game regular season (22 games for each of the 12 teams) began on October 10, 2014, and will end on March 21, 2015. The second half of the season consists of 4 teams from Adriatic League and the best 4 teams from first half of the season. Each team plays 14 games since March 28, 2015. until June 4, 2015. Playoff starts soon after. The first half is called First League and  second is called Super League.

Teams for 2014–15 season

First League

Standings

Results

Super League

Standings

Playoff stage

Stats leaders

MVP of the Round

First League
       
     
Super League

Play off

References

External links
 Official website of Serbian Basketball League

Basketball League of Serbia seasons
Serbia
Basketball